Kosmos 51 ( meaning Cosmos 51), also known as DS-MT No.3 was a technology demonstration satellite which was launched by the Soviet Union in 1964 as part of the Dnepropetrovsk Sputnik programme. Its primary mission was to demonstrate an electric gyrodyne orientation system. It also carried a scientific research package as a secondary payload, which was used to study cosmic rays and the luminosity of the stellar background.

It was launched aboard a Kosmos-2I 63S1 rocket from Site 86/1 at Kapustin Yar. The launch occurred at 23:02 GMT on 9 December 1964.

It decayed from orbit on 14 November 1965. Kosmos 51 was the last of three DS-MT satellites to be launched. The first was lost in a launch failure on 1 June 1963, and the second was launched as Kosmos 31 on 6 June 1964.

See also
 1964 in spaceflight

References

1964 in spaceflight
Kosmos 0051
1964 in the Soviet Union
Dnepropetrovsk Sputnik program